Ein Avdat or Ein Ovdat is a canyon in the Negev Desert of Israel, south of Kibbutz Sde Boker. Archaeological evidence shows that Ein Avdat was inhabited by Nabateans and Catholic monks. Numerous springs at the southern opening of the canyon empty into deep pools in a series of waterfalls. The water emerges from the rock layers with salt-tolerant plants like Poplar trees and Atriplexes growing  nearby.

Etymology
Ein is Hebrew and Arabic for spring or water source. Avdat derives from the nearby city of Avdat that stood south of the canyon. Avdat was named after the Nabataean King Obodas I who, according to tradition, was buried there.

History

Prehistoric era
Habitation during the prehistoric era is attested to by  numerous flint artifacts found in the area believed to be 80,000–90,000 years old and part of Mousterian culture. The flint in the outcrops nearby was utilized for arrows and points. Ostrich egg shells and onager bones shed light on the fauna of the time. Man-made knives and other hand held implements date from the Paleolithic and Mesolithic periods. Remains of a small settlement consisting of several round structures dates from the Bronze Age.

Antiquity
During the Hellenistic period Avdat became a station along the Nabatean Incense Route, an ancient trading route from Egypt to India through the Arabian Peninsula. Agriculture developed during the early Roman era. Forts along the Incense Route developed into thriving cities with many public buildings and farms.

In the Byzantine period, Ein Avdat was inhabited by monks who lived in caves. They carved out closets, shelves, benches, stairs, and water systems, and decorated the walls of the caves with crosses and prayers.

UNESCO, the United Nations Educational, Scientific and Cultural Organization recognizes Avdat as a Heritage Site in part because of the uniqueness of the magnificent Byzantine Church. Dating from the third century, it is both one of the earliest and one of the best-preserved churches constructed before the recognition of Christianity by the Emperor Constantine.  The church was badly damaged by Bedouin vandals in 2009.

After the Muslim conquest of Palestine, the region was abandoned.

Modern era
After the establishment of Kibbutz Sde Boker in 1952 and the construction of Highway 40 to Eilat, a hiking trail was created. Ein Avdat has been designated a National Park of Israel.

Geography

The canyon of Ein Avdat is part of Nahal Zin, the largest Wadi or dry riverbed in the Negev. The 120 kilometer-long riverbed begins at the northwestern tip of Makhtesh Ramon and heads north before veering sharply eastwards. Ein Avdat was created by erosion.

Springs
The southernmost spring  is Ein Ma'arif, featuring a series of waterfalls and pools. A Byzantine fortress overlooks the spring and adjacent agricultural land.

Further north is Ein Avdat, a 15-meter high waterfall that flows into an 8-meter deep pool of water divided by a small artificial dam.

Located near the northern entrance of the park is a spring called Ein Mor, named for the spice myrrh.

Growing around the springs are Poplar trees and Atriplexes, commonly known as saltbush, which grows on riverbanks and can tolerate salinity.

Climate

According to statistics compiled by a weather station at Sde Boker,  the summers are hot with almost no precipitation while the winters are cold with some rain. The humidity is relatively high.

Gallery

See also
Geography of Israel
Tourism in Israel
Wildlife in Israel

References

External links

Ein Avdat National Park

National parks of Israel
Archaeological sites in Israel
Springs of Israel
Oases of Israel
Ancient churches in the Holy Land
3rd-century churches
Protected areas of Southern District (Israel)
Mousterian